Salaam Namaste is a 2005 Indian romantic comedy film, directed by first-time director Siddharth Anand and produced by Aditya Chopra and Yash Chopra under the Yash Raj Films banner. The film stars Saif Ali Khan and Preity Zinta in their fourth film together. Arshad Warsi, Tania Zaetta and Jugal Hansraj appear in supporting roles. Released on 9 September 2005, it was the first Indian film to be filmed entirely in Australia.

The film tells the story of two young and modern Indians, Nick and Ambar, who have left their homes to make a life on their own in Melbourne, Australia. The story follows one year of their lives, dealing with their problems and relationships, from their first meeting at a wedding ceremony, to their decision to move in together without marriage, to their break-up upon discovering that Ambar is pregnant.

Salaam Namaste became the fourth-highest-grossing film of 2005 in India, as well as India's biggest hit in the overseas market that year. On 24 September 2005, the script of the film was invited to be included in the Margaret Herrick Library, which is operated by the Academy of Motion Picture Arts and Sciences. Zinta received high praise for her role and earned her nominations for Best Actress at the Filmfare Awards, IIFA Awards, Star Screen Awards and Zee Cine Awards.

Plot
Nikhil "Nick" Arora (Saif Ali Khan) and Ambar "Amby" Malhotra (Preity Zinta) are two progressive Indians who have left India to live in Melbourne, Australia. Nick was originally sent abroad to become an architect, but his real passion is cooking. After graduating, he designs a restaurant, which he takes over as head chef. While living at home in Bangalore, Ambar rejected more than a dozen marriage proposals. She traveled to Australia for a one-year foreign exchange program, then decided to stay and become a surgeon. After hearing this, her parents disowned her. To pay for her education, she works as an R.J. at a local radio station, Salaam Namaste'.

Nick is scheduled to do an interview for Salaam Namaste, but he oversleeps the first time, then again when it's rescheduled, and irritated Ambar insults him on-air. Nick becomes the caterer for a wedding Ambar attends. His best friend Ranjan "Ron" (Arshad Warsi) falls in love with Ambar's best friend Cathy (Tania Zaetta) at the wedding. Nick feels a connection with Ambar, although they have no idea who the other really is. Ron and Cathy hastily marry and Nick and Ambar discover each other's true identities. Nick gives the interview on Salaam Namaste, where he states that he loves Ambar. The pair fall in love and decide to move in together. A few months later, Ambar discovers she is pregnant, and they decide to end the pregnancy but she cannot go through with it. The pair argue and break up.

Over the next five months, they have several comical disagreements. During one argument, the baby kicks for the first time and Nick realises he still loves Ambar. Ambar asks Nick to take a blood test because she has thalassemia minor, and if he has the disease too, there will be complications. Nick takes the blood test and discovers that Ambar is carrying twins. On the way home, Nick realises he has left Ambar alone through the whole pregnancy when she needed him the most. He decides to commit to her and their children and goes to buy an engagement ring. At the store, he sees Ambar trying on rings with her friend, Jignesh. He believes she is marrying Jignesh and is devastated. In a drunken haze, he takes home a drunk girl from the bar named Stella. The next morning, an annoyed Stella tells Nick that all he did the previous night was cry over Ambar. Nick is relieved, but Ambar sees Stella in the bedroom and assumes that they have slept together. Nick discovers that Ambar was trying on rings for Jignesh's girlfriend, Tina. He searches for Ambar with the help of many devoted Salaam Namaste listeners. He finds her and apologises but Ambar's water breaks and they rush to the hospital.

At the hospital, Ron is there with Cathy, who's giving birth as well, and the nurse turns out to be Stella. She tells Ambar that Nick didn't do anything the previous night and is in love with Ambar. They meet the obstetrician Dr. Vijay (Abhishek Bachchan), who turns out to be a comical and incompetent doctor who albeit manages to deliver the children. Before the birth, Nick proposes to her, to which she joyously agrees.  Finally, Amber gives birth to twins.

Cast
 Saif Ali Khan as Nikhil "Nick" Arora
 Preity Zinta as Ambar "Amby" Malhotra
 Arshad Warsi as Ranjan "Ron" Mathur
 Tania Zaetta as Cathy Mathur
 Jugal Hansraj as Jignesh “Jerry” Pandya
 Abhishek Bachchan as Dr. Vijay Kumar MDGGO (Cameo)
 Jaaved Jaffrey as Jaggu Yadav aka Crocodile Dundee
 Kunal Vijaykar as Deepan Nair / Debonair (Owner of Salaam Namaste radio station)
 Ravi Khote as Aslam Dheka (Nick of Time Restaurant owner)
 Siddharth Anand as the Taxi Driver (special appearance)
 Maria Goretti as Lady at the bookstore (special appearance)
 Ness Wadia as the man reading the newspaper on the bus (special appearance)
 Jessica Craike as the lady giving birth (Pregnant Lady One)
 Kavita Kapoor as Dr. Reema Desai
 Lucas Campbell as the guy talking to "Nick" in Bar
 Andrew Willox as the Professor of Medicine
 Bonnie Hill as Stella

Production
The production began in February 2004 and concluded in March 2005. Several people made cameos in the film. Abhishek Bachchan is the narrator and makes a special appearance as a doctor towards the end. Director Siddharth Anand makes an appearance as the taxi driver towards the end. The mother and son in the bookshop Saif Ali Khan's character visits, are actor Arshad Warsi's wife and son, Maria Goretti and Zeke. Preity Zinta's then-boyfriend, Ness Wadia, makes an appearance as the man reading the newspaper beside whom Zinta sits on the bus.

Soundtrack

The film has seven songs composed by the duo Vishal–Shekhar. The music of the film released on 10 August 2005. The music includes 4 songs and 2 remixes. Lyrics are penned by Jaideep Sahni. According to the Indian trade website Box Office India, with around 14,00,000 units sold, this film's soundtrack album was the year's thirteenth highest-selling.

Themes
The film dealt with such topics as cohabitation, premarital sex and pregnancy, and the "altercation between domesticity and individual freedom". Authors Snachari De and Amit Sarwal noted the film for presenting the "Australian Dream" as an alternative for the American Dream. They further noted that premarital pregnancy was not tabooed in the film as would be expected from a film involving Indian characters. Subhash K. Jha further wrote, "Beneath the vibrant veneer, the film makes a very telling and serious comment on commitment-phobia especially among the ambitious urban males who would rather have their cake and sleep with it too."

ReleaseSalaam Namaste was the highest grossing Indian film at the overseas market. It grossed  worldwide.

Fran Bailey, Australia's Minister for Small Business and Tourism at the time, attributed the 21% growth of Indian tourism to Australia, to the film's success: "Australia is receiving enormous exposure through Salaam Namaste, the latest Bollywood hit filmed entirely on location in Victoria."

 Critical reception Salaam Namaste received positive reviews from critics upon release. 

Taran Adarsh from the entertainment portal Bollywood Hungama rated Salaam Namaste 4 out of 5 stars, calling it "an immensely likeable film that should appeal to all ages, mainly its target audience -- the youth". He further noted Khan for his "spirited performance" and Zinta "delivering her most accomplished performance to date". The film was said to resemble the 1995 American film Nine Months, with film critic Anubha Sawhney precising that it lifts particular scenes from the same. The Hindu noted "a surprising realness about the whole thing" and noted particularly the film's second-half where "everyone's too immersed in the story" and Zinta "especially does a good job with the hysterics". Dominic Ferrao of Filmfare noted that "Khan and Zinta come off with flying colors, delivering superlative and lively performances" and concluded that the film exemplifies how "Indian cinema is evolving". Pratim D. Gupta of The Telegraph called it "the movie of the year", praising Khan's comic timing and Zinta as "an absolute treat to watch".

Devyani Srivastava of Mid-Day believed the film's "substance lies in the pensive questions it poses, and answers, about adult relationships", and appreciated the "memorable performances", noting Zinta's character of "the strong-willed, independent Ambar" to be "a rare Bollywood heroine."

Subhash K. Jha argued that the treatment of the subjects, along with the performances, made up for an otherwise mediocre story. Screen described the film as "a visual treat", praised the performances of Khan and Zinta who "live their roles" and Anand's "confident debut". Sarita Tanwar of Mid Day noted the film's "bold, refreshing and unique" subject, praised the performances, but thought the script needed "some fine-tuning". Rediff's Lindsay Perreira concluded that "for an afternoon of laughs, some excellent performances by Khan, Zinta and Jaffrey, and a well-shot tour of Melbourne, you can't go wrong with Salaam Namaste". Rama Sharma of The Tribune gave a positive review of the main lead and concluded the film as worth a watch, despite an "inadequate" end.

Namrata Joshi of Outlook called it "a rare Hindi film" in its portrayal of the characters, but criticized the pregnancy part, which she found unconvincing. Khalid Mohamed of DNA India called it "a picture that's polarized between the terrific and the tedious", but noted the main leads.Salaam Namaste was reviewed positively by several foreign media outlets. Derek Elley of Variety noted its similarity to Nine Months and said it "serves up a bonny two-and-a-half hours of dialogue-driven entertainment". Elley called Khan "a real leading man" and Zinta "the most substantial actress among the younger Bollywood crop", believing they avoid sentimentality and "show the ability to spin on a dime between comedy and drama". Ethan Alter of Film Journal International concluded, "It's fair to say that the Melbourne setting-along with Khan and Zinta-makes the movie. Otherwise, it mainly feels like Bollywood business as usual." The BBCs Manish Gajjar described the film as "a great entertainer" and enjoyed the pairing of Khan and Zinta, who he thought performed convincingly and whose comic timing he found "just perfect". Writing for The New York Times'', Anita Gates praised Zinta as a "cheerleader-homecoming queen-fraternity sweetheart pretty" but gave the film a mixed review.

 Awards and nominations 51st Filmfare Awards:Nominated Best Actress – Preity Zinta
 Best Supporting Actor – Arshad Warsi
 Best Comedian – Javed Jaffrey7th IIFA Awards:Won Best Comedian – Javed JaffreyNominated'''

 Best Actor – Saif Ali Khan
 Best Actress – Preity Zinta

See also
 List of movies set in Australia

References

External links
 
 Salaam Namaste – official movie site

2005 films
2000s Hindi-language films
2005 comedy-drama films
Indian pregnancy films
Films set in Melbourne
Films shot in Melbourne
Yash Raj Films films
Films directed by Siddharth Anand
Films scored by Vishal–Shekhar
Indian remakes of American films
2005 directorial debut films